Neopamera is a genus of dirt-colored seed bugs in the family Rhyparochromidae. There are about 16 described species in Neopamera.

Species
These 16 species belong to the genus Neopamera:

 Neopamera albocincta (Barber, 1953)
 Neopamera bilobata (Say, 1831)
 Neopamera costalis (Stal, 1874)
 Neopamera crassicornis (Stal, 1874)
 Neopamera hondurana (Bergroth, 1914)
 Neopamera insularis (Barber, 1925)
 Neopamera intermedia (Barber, 1924)
 Neopamera neotropicalis (Kirkaldy, 1909)
 Neopamera pagana (White, 1879)
 Neopamera platana (Bergroth, 1894)
 Neopamera recincta (Breddin, 1901)
 Neopamera serripes (Walker, 1872)
 Neopamera tineodes (Burmeister, 1835)
 Neopamera tuberculata (Osborn, 1904)
 Neopamera vicaria (Barber, 1954)
 Neopamera vivida (Distant, 1893)

References

External links

 

Rhyparochromidae
Articles created by Qbugbot